The 2014 National Club Baseball Association (NCBA) Division I Tournament was a post-season tournament for the best teams in the NCBA during the 2014 season.  32 NCBA Division I college baseball teams met after playing their way through the regular season to play in the NCBA Tournament.  The tournament will culminate with eight teams competing for the 2014 NCBA Division I World Series at University of Tampa Baseball Stadium in Tampa, FL.

Regionals
The opening rounds of the tournament were played across eight pre-determined sites across the country, each consisting of a four-team field.  Each regional is double elimination.  The winner of each regional advances to the NCBA World Series.

Bold indicates winner.
The #4 seed is the at-large team in each region.

South Atlantic Regional
at LaGrange, GA

Southern Pacific Regional
at Riverside, CA

Gulf Coast Regional
at McKinney, TX

Mid-Atlantic Regional
at Martinsville, VA

North Atlantic Regional
at Oneonta, NY

Great Lakes Regional
at Battle Creek, MI

Mid-America Regional
at Topeka, KS

Northern Pacific Regional
at Missoula, MT

 Montana's participation in the 2014 NCBA Division I Regional was vacated due to use of an ineligible player

NCBA World Series

References

2014 in baseball
National Club Baseball Association
2014 in sports in Florida
Baseball competitions in Florida
Sports competitions in Tampa, Florida